Lotus Software (called Lotus Development Corporation before its acquisition by IBM) was an American software company based in Massachusetts; it was "offloaded" to India's HCL Technologies in 2018.

Lotus is most commonly known for the Lotus 1-2-3 spreadsheet application, the first feature-heavy, user-friendly, reliable and WYSIWYG-enabled product to become widely available in the early days of the IBM PC, when there was no graphical user interface. Much later, in conjunction with Ray Ozzie's Iris Associates, Lotus also released a groupware and email system, Lotus Notes. IBM purchased the company in 1995 for US$3.5 billion, primarily to acquire Lotus Notes and to establish a presence in the increasingly important client–server computing segment, which was rapidly making host-based products such as IBM's OfficeVision obsolete.

On December 6, 2018, IBM announced the sale of Lotus Software/Domino to HCL for $1.8 billion.

History 

Lotus was founded in 1982 by partners Mitch Kapor and Jonathan Sachs with backing from Ben Rosen. Lotus's first product was presentation software for the Apple II known as Lotus Executive Briefing System. Kapor founded Lotus after leaving his post as head of development at VisiCorp, the distributors of the VisiCalc spreadsheet, and selling all his rights to Visi-Plot and Visi-Trend to Visi-Corp.

Shortly after Kapor left Visi-Corp, he and Sachs produced an integrated spreadsheet and graphics program. Even though IBM and VisiCorp had a collaboration agreement whereby Visi-Calc was being shipped simultaneously with the PC, Lotus had a clearly superior product. Lotus released Lotus 1-2-3 on January 26, 1983. The name referred to the three ways the product could be used, as a spreadsheet, word processor, and database manager. In practice the latter two functions were less often used, but 1-2-3 was the most powerful spreadsheet program available.

Lotus was almost immediately successful, becoming the world's third largest microcomputer software company in 1983 with $53 million in sales in its first year, compared to its business plan forecast of $1 million in sales. In 1982 Jim Manzi — a graduate of Colgate University and The Fletcher School of Law and Diplomacy — came to Lotus as a management consultant with McKinsey & Company, and became an employee four months later. In October 1984 he was named president, and in April 1986 he was appointed CEO, succeeding Kapor. In July of that same year he also became chairman of the board. Manzi remained at the head of Lotus until 1995.

Dominance
As the popularity of the personal computer grew, Lotus quickly came to dominate the spreadsheet market. Lotus introduced other office products such as Ray Ozzie's Symphony in 1984 and the Jazz office suite for the Apple Macintosh computer in 1985. Jazz did very poorly in the market (in Guy Kawasaki's book The Macintosh Way, Lotus Jazz was described as being so bad, "even the people who pirated it returned it"). Also in 1985, Lotus bought Software Arts and discontinued its VisiCalc program.

In the late 1980s Lotus developed Lotus Magellan, a file management and indexing utility. In this period  Manuscript, a word processor, Lotus Agenda, an innovative personal information manager (PIM) which flopped, and Improv, a ground-breaking modeling package (and spreadsheet) for the NeXT platform, were released. Improv also flopped, and none of these products made a significant impact on the market.

"Look and feel" lawsuits

Lotus was involved in a number of lawsuits, of which the most significant were the "look and feel" cases which started in 1987. Lotus sued Paperback Software and Mosaic for copyright infringement, false and misleading advertising, and unfair competition over their low-cost clones of 1-2-3, VP Planner and Twin, and sued Borland over its Quattro spreadsheet. This led Richard Stallman, founder of the Free Software Foundation, to found the League for Programming Freedom (LPF) and hold protests outside Lotus Development offices. Paperback and Mosaic lost and went out of business; Borland won and survived. The LPF filed an amicus curiae brief in the Borland case.

Diversification and acquisition by IBM
In the 1990s, to compete with Microsoft's Windows applications, Lotus had to buy in products such as Ami Pro (word processor), Approach (database), and Threadz, which became Lotus Organizer. Several applications (1-2-3, Freelance Graphics, Ami Pro, Approach, and Lotus Organizer) were bundled together under the name Lotus SmartSuite. Although SmartSuite was bundled cheaply with many PCs and may initially have been more popular than Microsoft Office, Lotus quickly lost its dominance in the desktop applications market with the transition from 16- to 32-bit applications running on Windows 95. In large part due to its focusing much of its development resources on a suite of applications for IBM's new (and eventually commercially unsuccessful) OS/2 operating system, Lotus was late in delivering its suite of 32-bit products and failed to capitalize on the transition to the new version of Windows. The last significant new release was the SmartSuite Millennium Edition released in 1999.

All new development of the suite was ended in 2000, with ongoing maintenance being moved overseas. The last update release was 2014.

Lotus began its diversification from the desktop software business with its 1984 strategic founding investment in Ray Ozzie's Iris Associates, the creator of its Lotus Notes groupware platform. As a result of this early speculative move, Lotus had gained significant experience in network-based communications years before other competitors in the PC world had even started thinking about networked computing or the Internet. Lotus initially brought Lotus Notes to market in 1989, and later reinforced its market presence with the acquisition of cc:Mail in 1991. In 1994, Lotus acquired Iris Associates. Lotus's dominant groupware position attracted IBM, which needed to make a strategic move away from host-based messaging products and to establish a stronger presence in client–server computing, but it also soon attracted stiff competition from Microsoft Exchange Server.

In the second quarter of 1995 IBM launched a hostile bid for Lotus with a $60-per-share tender offer, when Lotus' stock was only trading at $32. Jim Manzi looked for potential white knights, and forced IBM to increase its bid to $64.50 per share, for a $3.5 billion buyout of Lotus in July 1995. On October 11, 1995 Manzi announced his resignation from what had become the Lotus Development division of IBM; he left with stock worth $78 million.

Assimilation of name, web site, and branding
While IBM allowed Lotus to develop, market and sell its products under its own brand name, a restructuring in January 2001 brought it more in line with its parent company, IBM. Also, IBM moved key marketing and management functions from Cambridge, Massachusetts, to IBM's New York office.

Gradually, the Lotus.com web site changed the "About us" section of its web site to eliminate references to "Lotus Development Corporation". The Lotus.com web page in 2001 clearly showed the company as "Lotus Development Corporation" with "a word from its CEO" by 2002 the "About us" section was removed from its site menu, and the Lotus logo was replaced with the IBM logo. By 2003 an "About Lotus" link returned to the Lotus.com page on its sidebar, but this time identifying the company as "Lotus software from IBM" and showing in its contact information "Lotus Software, IBM Software Group". By 2008 the Lotus.com domain name stopped showing a standalone site, instead redirecting to www.ibm.com/software/lotus, and in 2012 the site discontinued all reference to Lotus Software in favor of IBM Collaboration Solutions.

IBM discontinued development of IBM Lotus Symphony in 2012 with the final release of version 3.0.1, moving future development effort to Apache OpenOffice, and donating the source code to the Apache Software Foundation. Later that year, IBM announced it was discontinuing the Lotus brand and on March 13, 2013, IBM announced the availability of IBM Notes and Domino 9.0 Social Edition, replacing prior versions of IBM Lotus Notes and IBM Lotus Domino and marking the end of Lotus as an active brand.

On December 6, 2018, IBM announced the selling of Lotus Software/Domino to HCL for $1.8 billion.

Corporate culture

Lotus's first employee was Janet Axelrod who created the Human Resources organization and was the central figure in creating the Lotus culture. As she continued to build her organization and play a central role with senior management, she eventually hired Freada Klein as the first director of employee relations.

In 1995 Lotus had over 4,000 employees worldwide; IBM's acquisition of Lotus was greeted with apprehension by many Lotus employees, who feared that the corporate culture of "Big Blue" would smother their creativity. To the surprise of many employees and journalists, IBM initially adopted a very hands-off, laissez-faire attitude towards its new acquisition.

However, by 2000 the assimilation of Lotus was well underway. While the mass employee defections that IBM feared did not materialize, many long-time Lotus employees did complain about the transition to IBM's culture—IBM's employee benefits programs, in particular, were singled out as inferior to Lotus's very progressive programs.

Lotus's headquarters in Cambridge were originally divided into two buildings, the Lotus Development Building (LDB) on the banks of the Charles River, and the Rogers Street building, adjacent to the CambridgeSide Galleria. However, in 2001, then President and General Manager, Al Zollar decided not to renew the lease of LDB. The subsequent migration of employees across the street (and into home offices) generally coincided with what was probably the final exodus of employees from the company.  Later, IBM's offices at 1 Rogers St supported mobile employees, the Watson Research Center on User interface, and IBM DataPower.

Products

IBM sponsored the "Lotus Greenhouse", a community web site featuring software from IBM and its business partners.

Discontinued products

Lotus Connections
Lotus Domino
Lotus Domino Web Access
Lotus Expeditor
Lotus Forms
Lotus Foundations
LotusLive
Lotus Mashups
Lotus Notes
Lotus Notes Traveler
IBM Lotus Quickr, which replaces Lotus QuickPlace
Lotus Sametime
IBM Lotus Web Content Management

Lotus SmartSuite including Lotus 1-2-3, Lotus Word Pro, Lotus Freelance Graphics, Lotus Approach, Lotus Organizer (discontinued on 30-Sep-2014)
Lotus Domino Document Manager (discontinued on 30-Sep-2012)
Lotus Agenda
Lotus cc:Mail
Lotus HAL
Lotus Impress
Lotus Improv
Lotus Jazz
Lotus Magellan
Lotus Manuscript
Lotus Marketplace
Lotus Symphony (DOS version)
IBM Lotus Symphony
LotusWorks (formerly AlphaWorks, bought from Alpha Software in May 1990)

References

External links
Official website

Lotus.com Official website (Archive)
Oral history interview with Jonathan Sachs discusses the development of Lotus 1-2-3, Charles Babbage Institute, University of Minnesota

Software companies established in 1982
American companies established in 1982
Lotus Software software
IBM acquisitions
Companies based in Cambridge, Massachusetts
Software companies based in Massachusetts
1982 establishments in Massachusetts
1995 mergers and acquisitions
Defunct software companies of the United States